Nikanor Teratologen ("Nikanor the teratologist"), real name Niclas Lundkvist, born 27 October 1964 in Kåge, Västerbotten, is a Swedish novelist, essayist, translator and literary critic. His 1992 debut novel Assisted Living received considerable publicity in Sweden for its transgressive content and advanced use of language, which created a literary scandal and led to speculation about its author.

Career
Nikanor Teratologen debuted in 1992 with the novel Assisted Living (Äldreomsorgen i Övre Kågedalen, lit. "the elderly care in Upper Kåge Valley"), written in local dialect and full of transgressive content such as pedophilia, incest, necrophilia, antisemitism, cannibalism and strong violence. The book was published through the major publisher Norstedts förlag and created a scandal. Due to the advanced use of language, several critics were convinced that the book was written by an established novelist from Västerbotten, and people such as Stig Larsson, Per Olov Enquist and Torgny Lindgren were mentioned as suspects. Eventually a journalist was able to identify the real author, which was followed by further rumours and speculation about Teratologen's interests and personality. The book eventually received cult status and had become a commercial success by the mid 2000s. It was published in English in 2012 through Dalkey Archive Press.

A sequel to Assisted Living, Förensligandet i det egentliga Västerbotten, was published in 1998. Teratologen has since published three additional books: Apsefiston (2002), Hebbershålsapokryferna (2002) and Att hata allt mänskligt liv (2009). He has described the poet Comte de Lautréamont as his "great precursor", and has also mentioned Friedrich Nietzsche as a major influence.

He has translated works by Nietzsche and Emil Cioran into Swedish. In 2010 he received the award Beskowska resestipendiet from the Swedish Academy.

Bibliography
 Assisted Living (Äldreomsorgen i Övre Kågedalen) (1992)
 Förensligandet i det egentliga Västerbotten (1998)
 Apsefiston (2002)
 Hebbershålsapokryferna (2002)
 Att hata allt mänskligt liv (2009)

References

External links
 Nikanor Teratologen at Dalkey Archive Press' website

1964 births
20th-century Swedish novelists
21st-century Swedish novelists
Living people
People from Skellefteå Municipality
Swedish literary critics
Swedish essayists
Swedish translators
Swedish-language writers
Translators to Swedish
Writers from Västerbotten
20th-century translators
20th-century essayists
21st-century essayists
Translators of Friedrich Nietzsche
20th-century pseudonymous writers
21st-century pseudonymous writers